Phaeoramularia dissiliens is a fungal plant pathogen which causes cercospora leaf spot on grapes.

External links 
 Index Fungorum
 USDA ARS Fungal Database

References 

Fungal grape diseases
Leaf diseases
Phaeoramularia
Fungi described in 1976